Computational Biology and Chemistry is a peer-reviewed scientific journal published by Elsevier covering all areas of computational life sciences. The current editor-in-chief are  Wentian Li (The Feinstein Institute for Medical Research) and Donald Hamelberg (Georgia State University). The journal was established in 1976 as Computers & Chemistry, with DeLos F. DeTar (Florida State University) as its first editor. It obtained its current title in 2003 under the editorship of Andrzej K Konopka and James Crabble (University of Bedfordshire).

Abstracting and indexing 
The journal is abstracted and indexed in:

According to the Journal Citation Reports, the journal had a 2011 impact factor of 1.551, ranking it 42nd out of 85 journals in the category "Biology" and 36th out of 99 journals in the category "Computer Science, Interdisciplinary Applications"

References

External links 
 

Bioinformatics and computational biology journals
Publications established in 1976
English-language journals
Elsevier academic journals
7 times per year journals